The DS 4 (Citroën DS4 before 2015) is a compact car, and it is the second model in the luxury DS sub-brand created by Citroën, now an independent brand. Starting in 2021, it is currently in its second generation, which is based on an all-new EMP2 platform shared with the Opel Astra VI and Peugeot 308 III.



First generation (NX; 2010) 

Based upon the Citroën C4 II, the first generation was officially launched internationally in March 2011, but already on sale in some countries by the end of 2010. It features raised suspension to resemble a compact SUV and repositioned door handles to give it a coupé like silhouette.

The rear windows are fixed, and do not slide down or open outwards.

At launch, the petrol engines that powered the DS 4 were all a product of a collaboration between PSA and BMW, all being 1,598 cc four-cylinder, 16 valve units. The base VTi 120 was normally aspirated and put out . As its name implies it came with variable valve timing. The next engine up was the THP 155, essentially a turbocharged version of the VTi.

It put out  thanks to a twin-scroll turbocharger and dual overhead cams, and used a six-speed manual transmission. Citroën initially offered two diesel engines in the DS 4 – the HDi 110, a 1,560 cc four-cylinder that put out  and the four-cylinder HDi 160 also found in the sedan Citroën C5. There was also a 2-liter diesel displacing 1,997 cc and producing .

The engine line up differs significantly. The DS 4 is available with Start&Stop technology and Citroën says that the battery has been optimised to withstand up to 600,000 starting cycles. The boot is 385 litres or 1021 litres with the back seats folded down. The DS 4's styling has been very well received by the international press.

It was elected Most Beautiful Car of the Year at the International Automobile Festival, beating BMW’s new F10 5 Series and Honda's new CR-Z hybrid car. German magazine Auto Bild, and its partner magazines throughout Europe, have given it first prize for design, in its category in the contest Design Award. Production of the DS 4 ended in April 2018.

2015 facelift 

In August 2015, the facelifted DS 4 was announced by DS Automobiles, as part of their separation from Citroën to become a standalone brand. The revised model no longer featured Citroën badges, with the 'DS Wings' grille design. The facelift also introduces the DS 4 Crossback variation, fitted with large black wheels, wheel arch trims and roof bars.

The interior has been refined with door panels upholstered in Nappa leather while the seats are upholstered in semi-analine leather featuring a signature 'watch-strap' design. The DS 4 also features a panoramic windscreen offering 45 degree upward vision for greater visibility while both the driver and passenger have rigid individual blinds and folding sun shields.

There was also a 1.6-litre engine offering  and 285 Nm of torque, only be available for the DS4 hatchback. The diesel range is completed with a 2.0-litre diesel engine that offers  and 400 Nm of torque and is only available with a 6-speed automatic.

Safety

The European New Car Assessment Programme (Euro NCAP) (Europe’s rough equivalent to the United States’s IIHS) gave the DS4 one five-star rating overall. The Peugeot 508 was scored the same, with the only difference being a higher child occupant rating in the 508, and slightly higher pedestrian impact rating for the DS4.

Engines

Second generation (2021)

The second generation of the DS 4 was unveiled on 3 February 2021. It is intended to replace the DS 5 which was discontinued in 2018 and is based on the PSA EMP2 platform of the PSA Group. The car is available in three versions: DS 4, DS 4 Cross and DS 4 Performance Line.

It was designed in Paris, but will be produced at Opel's plant in Rüsselsheim. It is intended to compete with the BMW 1 Series and Audi A3 hatchback, but can also compete with the Mercedes-Benz A-Class.

In terms of powertrains, a E-TENSE hybrid version will be available, and in terms of gasoline engines, it is equipped with the PureTech range with powers of 130, 180 or 220 HP. It is available for sale from the fourth quarter of 2021.

2022 refresh
In October 2022, the trim structure was revised, which now includes a new Opera flagship and increased EV range for the PHEV version.

Esprit de Voyage
Introduced in March 2023, the "Esprit de Voyage" special edition, French for "spirit of travel", is the flagship trim level for the DS 4 and DS 7 and features new materials and color combinations inspired by the fashion industry.

Production and sales

References

Citroën vehicles
DS vehicles
Luxury vehicles
Compact cars
Hatchbacks
Euro NCAP small family cars
Cars introduced in 2011